Pierrick Bourgeat (born 28 January 1976) is a retired French alpine skier.

He was born in Grenoble.

Bourgeat represented France at the 2006 Winter Olympics. He also won a bronze medal in team competition at the FIS Alpine World Ski Championships 2005.

External links
Personal web page

 

1976 births
Living people
French male alpine skiers
Olympic alpine skiers of France
Alpine skiers at the 1998 Winter Olympics
Alpine skiers at the 2002 Winter Olympics
Alpine skiers at the 2006 Winter Olympics
Sportspeople from Grenoble
21st-century French people